Josef Schüttler (December 11, 1902 – October 7, 1972) was a German politician of the Christian Democratic Union (CDU) and former member of the German Bundestag.

Life 
From 1946 he sat for four years in the constituent state assembly and in the state parliament of South Baden. In 1949, as in 1953 and 1957, he was elected directly to the German Bundestag for the constituency of Constance, of which he was a member until 1961.

Literature

References

1902 births
1972 deaths
Members of the Bundestag for Baden-Württemberg
Members of the Bundestag 1957–1961
Members of the Bundestag 1953–1957
Members of the Bundestag 1949–1953
Members of the Bundestag for the Christian Democratic Union of Germany